The Spanish Expedition to Tlemcen was an unsuccessful campaign led by the Spanish Empire in an attempt to install a client Zayyanid prince on the throne in Tlemcen.

In 1535 Martin Angulo led a campaign in Tlemcen with the aim of installing a Zayyanid pretender on the throne. Pinned down in the fortress of Tibda, the Spanish forces were overwhelmed by the Banu Rashid. The Spaniards suffered a disastrous defeat and only 70 men who were taken prisoner survived.

References 

16th century in Algeria
Battles involving Algeria
1535 in Spain
Battles involving Spain